Mahadeva Achchirama Children Home (also known as Mahadeva Ashtrama Saivach Chiruvar Illam, Kurukulam and Gurukulam) is situated in Jeyanthy Nagar, Puthumurippu, Kilinochchi, Sri Lanka. The children home is an orphanage for children who have been affected by the 2009 civil war in Sri Lanka. It is registered with Department of Social Services, Northern Province.

The president of the children's home is T. Rasanayagam.

Gallery

References

External links

 Official website
 Mahadeva Ashram – Kilinochchi
 Donation of Necessities to Orphanages in Killinochchi and Vavuniya

Orphanages in Sri Lanka
Residential buildings in Kilinochchi District